James, Jim, Jimmy, or Jamie Oliver may refer to:

Politics
James C. Oliver (1895–1986), American politician
James Harrison Oliver (1857–1928), American admiral and governor of the United States Virgin Islands
Michael Oliver (Lord Mayor) (James Michael Yorrick Oliver, born 1940), Lord Mayor of London 2001–2002
James T. Oliver (1849–1923), American politician
James V. Oliver, American politician from Maine
James W. Oliver (1844–1911), New York politician

Sports
Jim Oliver (baseball) (1919–1971), American baseball player
Jim Oliver (footballer) (born 1941), Scottish former footballer

Others
James Oliver (inventor) (1823–1908), American inventor and industrialist
James Arthur Oliver (1914–1981), American zoologist, herpetologist, and educator
James Edward Oliver (1829-1895), American mathematician and educator
Jamie Oliver (born 1975), English chef
Jamie Oliver (musician) (born 1975), keyboards player of Welsh band Lostprophets
Jim Oliver (novelist), American novelist
Jimmy Oliver (musician) (1920–2005), saxophonist and bandleader

See also
 Jimmy Oliver (disambiguation), multiple people
 Jaime Oliver (1927–1998), Spaniard boxer
 Oliver James (disambiguation)
 Oliver (disambiguation)
 James (disambiguation)